Rans Coyote can refer to a number of different aircraft:

Rans S-4 Coyote
Rans S-5 Coyote
Rans S-6 Coyote II